The Supreme Federal Court (abbreviated STF) is the supreme court (court of last resort) of Brazil, serving primarily as the Constitutional Court of the country. It is the highest court of law in Brazil for constitutional issues and its rulings cannot be appealed. On cases involving exclusively non-constitutional issues, regarding federal laws, the highest court is, by rule, the Superior Court of Justice.

History 

The court was inaugurated during the colonial era in 1808, the year that the royal family of Portugal (the House of Braganza) arrived in Rio de Janeiro. It was originally called the House of Appeals of Brazil.

The proclamation of the Brazilian Declaration of Independence and the adoption of the Imperial Constitution in 1824 preceded the establishment of the Supreme Court of Justice in 1829. With the first Constitution of the Republic, the current court was established.

Although the constitutional norms that regulated the creation of the court allowed Deodoro da Fonseca, Brazil's first president, to nominate an entirely new court, the president chose to nominate as the first members of the Supreme Federal Court the ministers who were then serving as members of the predecessor imperial court.

Two hundred members have served on the court. The Constitution of 1891 decided that the court would have 15 members. When Getúlio Vargas came into power, the number of members was reduced to 11. The number was changed to 16 in 1965, but returned to 11 in 1969 and has not changed since. Of all presidents of Brazil, only Café Filho never nominated a minister.

All judicial and administrative meetings of the Supreme Court have been broadcast live on television since 2002. The court is open for the public to watch the meetings.

On 8 January 2023, the building was attacked by supporters of the former president, Jair Bolsonaro.

Functions 
Alongside its appeal competence, mostly by the Extraordinary Appeal, the Court has a small range of cases of original jurisdiction, including the power of judicial review, judging the constitutionality of laws passed by the National Congress, through a Direct Action of Unconstitutionality (or ADI). There are also other mechanisms for reaching the Court directly, such as the Declaratory Action of Constitutionality (or ADC) and the Direct Action of Unconstitutionality by Omission ( or ADO).

Case law 
In May 2009 The Economist called the Supreme Federal Court "the most overburdened court in the world, thanks to a plethora of rights and privileges entrenched in the country's 1988 constitution (...) till recently the tribunal's decisions did not bind lower courts. The result was a court that is overstretched to the point of mutiny. The Supreme Court received 100,781 cases last year."

Overruling seems to be frequent in SFC jurisprudence: "three years ago when the STF adopted the understanding that defendants who have a conviction upheld by a single appellate court may be sent to jail to begin serving their sentences.  (...) The 2016 decision happened largely due to a change in opinion from Justice Gilmar Mendes (...). He had voted against sending defendants to jail after a single failed appeal in 2009, but changed his mind in 2016. Jump to 2019, and the circumstances – both political and judicial – have changed".

President and Vice-President of the Court 
The president and vice-president of the court are elected by their peers for a two-year term by secret ballot. The incumbent president is Rosa Weber.

Re-election for a consecutive term is not allowed. By tradition, the most senior minister who has not yet served in the presidential role is elected as the president by the court members, to avoid politicisation of the court.

If all currently sitting members have already served in the presidential role, the rotation starts all over again. However, due to vacancies caused by the compulsory retirement age and subsequent appointment of new ministers, it is very rare for the cycle to be ever completed. Some ministers are forced to retire before their turn for the presidency arrives, as was expected to happen with Teori Zavascki.

According to the same convention, the minister who is next in the line of succession for the presidency will serve as the vice-president for the time being. Also by tradition, the elections of the president and vice-president are never unanimous, there being always one isolated minority vote in each election, as the ministers who are to be elected never cast their votes for themselves; such votes are cast either for the dean of the courtits most senior memberor for some other elder minister that the one to be elected admires and wants to pay homage to.

The chief justice is also the 4th in the presidential line of succession, when the president of Brazil becomes prevented to be in charge, being preceded by the vice-president, the president of the Chamber of Deputies, and the president of the Federal Senate, as provided in Article 80 of the Brazilian Constitution.

Current members 
The eleven judges of the court are called Ministers, although having no similarity with the government body of ministers. They are appointed by the president and approved by the Senate. There is no term length but a mandatory retirement age of 75.

Notes
 M. Names in bold are the names used in social denomination.

Gallery

See also 
 Brazil federal courts
 List of Ministers of the Supreme Federal Court (Brazil)
 Tribunal de Justiça

Notes

References

External links 

 
 Photo 360° of Supreme Federal Court – GUIABSB 

Judiciary of Brazil
Brazil
Brazil
1808 establishments in Brazil
Courts and tribunals established in 1808